Glitre Energi Produksjon (formerly EB Kraftproduksjon AS) is a Norwegian power company that operates 31 hydroelectric power plants, primarily in Buskerud, with total average annual production of 2.3 TWh. The company is owned by Glitre Energi (100%).

Electric power companies of Norway
Energy companies established in 1997
Companies based in Drammen
Privately held companies of Norway
1997 establishments in Norway